Raymond Pierre Paul Westerling (31 August 1919 – 26 November 1987) was a Greek-Dutch military officer of the Royal Netherlands East Indies Army. He orchestrated a contraguerrilla in Sulawesi during the Indonesian National Revolution after World War II and participated in a coup attempt against the Indonesian government in January 1950, a month after the official transfer of sovereignty. Both actions were denounced as war crimes by the Indonesian authorities. Born in the Ottoman Empire, his nickname was "The Turk", however Westerling was actually of Greek ethnic background.

Early life
Raymond "The Turk" Westerling was born on 31 August 1919 in Istanbul. He was the son of a Greek mother and a Dutch father, whose family had lived there for three generations. He grew up speaking Greek, Turkish, French and English, and later wrote: "One of the few Western European languages that I didn’t speak a word of was my mother tongue: Dutch." When World War II engulfed Europe in 1941, he went to the Dutch consulate in Istanbul and enlisted in the Royal Netherlands Army, much to his father's dismay.

Military career

World War II
Westerling received his military instruction under the British. In July 1942, he completed his commando training from the Commando Basic Training Center in Achnacarry, Scotland under William E. Fairbairn.

After his promotion to corporal, Westerling became the instructor for "Unarmed Combat" and "Silent Killing", in No. 2 Dutch Troop, No. 10 (Inter-Allied) Commando. Within a year, he was teaching these skills to 10 Commando as a whole, and was also instructing in "Toughness Training". At his own request, he left this staff position and, in December 1943, he rejoined No. 2 Dutch Troop in India. In Ceylon, he underwent jungle training. To his disappointment, Westerling was never sent to the front line.

Indonesian National Revolution

North Sumatra
Westerling first came to Indonesia in September 1945, landing in Medan, North Sumatra, as an officer of the KNIL. Conditions there, as in much of Indonesia, were tense and chaotic after the end of the Japanese occupation. Since the end of World War II, parts of the Indonesian people were in an armed and diplomatic struggle against the Dutch for independence. To restore Dutch control in Medan, Westerling set up an intelligence network and a police force. Within a few months he had built a reputation for successfully rooting out enemies classified as rogue elements by the Dutch, with methods such as his elimination of a gang leader who went by the name of Terakan and who was said to be responsible for attacks against European and Indonesian civilians in North Sumatra. In his memoirs he described his action as follows: “We planted a stake in the middle of the village and on it we impaled the head of Terakan. Beneath it we nailed a polite warning to the members of his band that if they persisted in their evildoing, their heads would join his own.”

Southern Sulawesi

Having completed his first assignment, Westerling took over the Depot Special Forces (DST) commando unit. Westerling's training of his unit was primarily based on his experiences with the British commandos. In September 1946, the DST, stationed at Batavia (modern-day Jakarta), numbered about 130 soldiers, a mix of Dutch war volunteers, and Indonesians. In December 1946, he received the instruction to eliminate the insurgency and to restore Dutch control in Sulawesi. Guerilla fighters from Java had joined the local groups and government officials and members of the pro-Dutch Eurasian and Indo-Chinese community, were attacked and killed. The KNIL garrisons, stationed on the island, were not able to provide protection.

Westerling claimed that “pacifying” Southern Celebes without losing thousands of innocent lives could only be accomplished by instituting summary justice, on the spot, for suspected enemy fighters, who were generally executed. This became known as part of the "Westerling Method". Based on information received from his own informants or the Dutch military intelligence service, the members of the DST surrounded one of more suspected villages during night, after which they drove the population to a central location. At daybreak, the operation began, often led by Westerling. Men would be separated from women and children. From information obtained through spying and the local people, Westerling exposed certain people as terrorists and murderers. Based on this information they were shot. Afterwards, Westerling would install a new village leader and set up a village police force. All present would have to swear on the Koran that they would not follow in the path of the “terrorists". Dutch historian Lou de Jong commented in his publication on Westerling's action: "There may have been guilty ones among those indicated as having aided the T.R.I.S. or other resistance groups, but surely there were innocent ones among them. Besides that: there was no judicial basis for these summary judicial bloodbaths – even in a state of war they did not exist." In the recent publication of Geersing, he claim the actions of Westerling where in conformity with the existing and applicable legal and military principles and regulations in those days.

The counter-insurgency operation started in December 1946 and ended in February 1947. In his book De Zuid-Celebes Affaire: Kapitein Westerling en de standrechtelijke executies, Dutch revisionist historian Willem IJzereef claims that the actions of the DST cost about 1,500 Indonesian lives. About 400 of them were executed during actions led by Westerling himself, while the remaining 1,100 were killed during actions of his second in command. The responsibility  for these executions was this second in command, as was stated by the investigational committee Enthoven (1948) Another 1,500 deaths could be added by actions of other KNIL units. Approximately 900 Indonesians were killed by pro-Dutch police units and members of the village police. IJzereef believes that Indonesian resistance caused around 1,500 victims.

Westerling's actions temporarily restored Dutch control in Southern Celebes.  Until the end of 1949 the situation there was relatively quiet and under control. However, the Netherlands East Indies government and the Dutch army command soon realised that Westerling's actions led to growing public criticism. There was an official inquiry by the Dutch government in April 1947 and Raymond Westerling's actions were justified by this committee. In 1948 he decided to leave the army. He was relieved of his duties in November 1948.

Attempted coup

Raymond Westerling settled down in western Java, married and started a transportation company. Here he put together an armed movement from groups opposed to the impending transfer of official power from the Dutch to the Indonesian Republic with the aim of preserving the autonomy of the Dutch-created state of Pasundan in western Java. Westerling named his movement the Legion of Ratu Adil (APRA) from the Javanese myth that a messianic figure would come to save the people of Java and establish universal peace and justice.

Supporters were recruited from several social, cultural, and political groups. They were Sundanese who wanted an independent Pasundan not ruled by Javanese, defectors from the Indonesian Republican Army, soldiers of the DST and other KNIL units, who opposed the creation of the Indonesian republic. Raymond Westerling claimed that the APRA counted 22,000 men. However, Dutch historian Jaap de Moor says that such an extensive organization only existed in the fantasy of Westerling. On 5 January 1950, Westerling sent an ultimatum to the government of Jakarta. His demands were the recognition of the APRA as the official army of the state of Pasundan and unconditional respect for the autonomy of the federal states. Westerling added that if the answer was not positive, he could not be held responsible for the outbreak of large-scale fighting by the APRA.

With no reply to his ultimatum, Westerling started the coup in the night of 22–23 January, a month after international recognition of the Republic of Indonesia. His plan was to attack Bandung and Jakarta at the same time, concentrating on garrisons, police stations, media centres and other key positions. The APRA would raid and eliminate the Hatta cabinet during one of its government meetings. An interim-federal government, presided over by Sultan Hamid II of Pontianak, would take control. Despite their numerical inferiority to the Siliwangi Division, Westerling's men captured Bandung. However, they failed to take over Jakarta. Law and order were quickly restored by the Republican army and the Indonesian police force. In spite of the coup's relative brevity, it claimed dozens of lives on both sides. While the Dutch government officially condemned the coup, they helped smuggle Westerling out of Indonesia to Singapore.

Accusations of war crimes
Westerling continued to defend his actions and denied accusations of war crimes. His memoirs devote a chapter to his self-defense. "They painted me as a bloodthirsty monster, who attacked the people of Celebes by fire and sword and exposed all those, who in the interest of Indonesia's national independence resisted Dutch rule, to a merciless campaign of repression". Westerling stated he had based his tactics on the premise that he performed the role of policeman, combating terror: "I arrested terrorists, not because they acted as instigators of the Republican government... but because they made themselves guilty of open and unmistaken crimes...I never had them [his troops] bombard a village, nor did I take the hut of innocent under fire. I had executed some criminals, but nobody had died needlessly or wrongly by my doing.

He was denounced as a war criminal by the Indonesian government and left-wing parties in the Netherlands. Westerling was twice the subject of official inquiries. Dutch historian Nico Schulte Nordholt stated: "...his actions had the approval of the highest authorities, and in the eyes of the Dutch authorities, he was successful at the time. Determant and effective". In 1949, the Dutch–Indonesian agreement on transfer of power stipulated neither country would call the other on its wartime offences, thus ruling out any attempt by Indonesia to press for Westerling's extradition.
Geersing wrote in his book, that Westerling received his orders from the political and military top in Batavia with the consent of the Dutch government representatives there. (Commissie-Generaal)

In a 1969 television interview, Westerling admitted to the war crimes but stated that the Dutch government supported him.

In a 1971 interview he gave to the weekly Panorama Westerling revealed that he had court-martialed and executed 350 prisoners.

Postwar
Via Belgium, Westerling reached the Netherlands, where he settled down with his Indonesian-French wife, Yvonne Fournier, in a small town in the province of Friesland. Westerling later studied voice at the Amsterdam conservatory. His début as a tenor in Puccini's Tosca in the city of Breda in 1958, however, proved unsuccessful. Westerling later divorced and remarried. He moved to Amsterdam, where he ran an antique book store. Westerling died of heart failure in November 1987 in Purmerend.

Popular culture
Raymond Westerling was depicted by Marwan Kenzari in the 2020 film The East, which focuses on his role in leading counterinsurgency operations in South Sulawesi during the Indonesian National Revolution.

References

Footnotes

Bibliography

External links
 Westerling biography in the Dutch language
 Celebes VPRO Documentary on Westerling's counter-insurgency operation in southern Sulawesi
 Images of Westerling, his troops, his passport and gravestone
 Summary of Dutch publications about Westerling and his actions in Indonesia

1919 births
1987 deaths
Dutch anti-communists
Dutch people of Greek descent
Dutch war crimes
Military personnel from Istanbul
Dutch people of the Indonesian National Revolution
Royal Netherlands East Indies Army officers
Royal Netherlands East Indies Army personnel of World War II
Turkish emigrants to the Netherlands